The Gibraltar women's national football team represents the British Overseas Territory of Gibraltar in international women's football. Although the Gibraltar Football Association is a member of UEFA and FIFA, the association is yet to field a women's team in FIFA Women's World Cup or UEFA Women's Championship qualification. Instead, the team has largely been restricted to appearances at the biennial Island Games football tournaments, first appearing in the 2015 edition. The team is currently managed by Janssen Olivero.

History
Women's football is still in its infancy in Gibraltar, with only three teams participating in the Gibraltar Women's Football League as of the 2018–19 season. However it has grown with 5 teams competing in 2021–22. In 2014, it did host a women's development tournament organised by UEFA, losing 1–0 in its first game to Andorra. The side lost all three games against Andorra, Luxembourg and an Algarve XI. However, as a development tournament, these games are not recognised as full internationals.

Since then, Gibraltar's involvement in UEFA sanctioned women's football has been limited to sending under-16 girls' teams to participate in development tournaments, most recently in Malta in 2019. In June 2021 the team made their debut in a full international, in a 4–1 defeat to Liechtenstein.

Since 2015 the Gibraltar women's team has taken part in the Island Games, and the players have yet to take part in a UEFA Women's Championship since their FA's admission into the organisation. However, in November 2021 it was announced that an under-19 team would be formed and entered into qualification for the 2023 UEFA Women's Under-19 Championship.

Results and fixtures

The following is a list of match results in the last 12 months, as well as any future matches that have been scheduled.

 Legend

2022

Gibraltar Fixtures and Results – Soccerway.com

Head-to-head record
The following table shows Gibraltar's all-time international record.

FIFA official "A" matches only

Unofficial match record

Coaching staff

Current coaching staff

Manager history

Managers before 2019 are unknown. Matches before 2021 are not recognised by FIFA.
Up to date as of 5 September 2022

Players

Current squad
The following players have been called up to the squad for the following friendlies:
 Match date: 5 September 2022
 Opposition: 
 Caps and goals correct as of: 5 September 2022, after the match against .

Recent call-ups
The following players have been called up to the Gibraltar squad in the past 12 months.

Competitive record

FIFA Women's World Cup

UEFA Women's Euro

Island Games

Player records
As of 20 February 2022

Most capped

Most goals

Players with an equal number of goals are ranked in order of average.

Captains

Goalkeepers

 Players in bold are still actively competing and are available for selection

See also
Sport in Gibraltar
Football in Gibraltar
Women's football in Gibraltar
Gibraltar women's national futsal team
Gibraltar men's national football team

References

External links
Gibraltar Football Association 

 
Football in Gibraltar
European women's national association football teams